The Electoral district of Maryborough and Daylesford was an electoral district of the Victorian Legislative Assembly. It included the towns of Maryborough and Daylesford, around 168 km and 155 km north-west of Melbourne respectively.

It was created when the electoral districts of Maryborough and Daylesford were combined in 1927; George Frost was the last member for Maryborough.

Members for Maryborough and Daylesford

Election results

See also
 Parliaments of the Australian states and territories
 List of members of the Victorian Legislative Assembly

References

Former electoral districts of Victoria (Australia)
1927 establishments in Australia
1945 disestablishments in Australia